The 2021–22 Tweede Divisie, known as Jack's League for sponsorship reasons, season was the sixth edition of the Dutch third tier since ending its hiatus since the 1970-71 season and the 21st edition using the Tweede Divisie name.

At an extraordinary KNVB federation meeting on 2 October 2017, representatives of the amateur and professional football reached an agreement about the route to be taken to renew the football pyramid. Part of this agreement was that no promotion or relegation took place between the Eerste and Tweede Divisie for the 2017–18 season at first.

At another extraordinary KNVB meeting on 7 June 2018, an agreement was reached on the number of reserves teams allowed in each division after the 2019–20 season and the extension of the non-promotion or relegation clause to initially two more seasons. For the Tweede Divisie it was two teams.

The KNVB met again on 16 December 2019 and decided to further extend the clause to last until 2022–23 and to relegate reserve teams from the Tweede Divisie along with the other second teams in the new under-21 competition.

Teams

Number of teams by province

Standings

Regular competition

Fixtures/results

Promotion/relegation play-offs

U21 play-offs 
Since Jong Volendam finished as the lowest reserve team in the regular league season, they had to play a promotion-relegation play-offs tie against the champions of the Under-21 league, Almere City U21, for a spot in the 2022–23 Tweede Divisie.

Derde Divisie promotion/relegation playoffs 
Since Kozakken Boys and GVVV finished 16th and 17th respectively, they will have to play relegation playoffs against teams from the Derde Divisie for one spot in the 2022–23 Tweede Divisie.

Bracket

Quarterfinals

First legs

Second legs

Semifinals

First legs

Second legs

Final

First leg

Second leg

Top scorers

References 

Tweede Divisie seasons
Tweede Divisie
Netherlands